Jordi Matamala Muntadas (born 18 May 1976) is a Spanish former professional footballer who played as a central midfielder.

He amassed Segunda División totals of 199 matches and ten goals over six seasons, representing in the competition Girona and Recreativo (three years apiece).

Club career
Born in Vilobí d'Onyar, Girona, Catalonia, Matamala reached the Segunda División for the first time in 2008–09 at the age of 32, with Girona FC, which he had helped promote from Segunda División B the previous year. In the following two seasons, he was again an undisputed started for the club as it consecutively managed to retain its league status; he made his debut in the second tier on 30 August 2008, playing the full 90 minutes and being booked in a 1–0 away win against RC Celta de Vigo.

Matamala signed for another side in that league in the summer of 2010, Recreativo de Huelva. He started in 26 matches in his first year (2,318 minutes of action overall), and the team finished in 12th position.

On 26 July 2014, the 38-year-old Matamala returned to Palamós CF who still competed in Tercera División. He retired after two campaigns with the club in that level.

References

External links

1976 births
Living people
People from Selva
Sportspeople from the Province of Girona
Spanish footballers
Footballers from Catalonia
Association football midfielders
Segunda División players
Segunda División B players
Tercera División players
CE L'Hospitalet players
Girona FC players
Palamós CF footballers
Recreativo de Huelva players
Catalonia international footballers